TMEM156 is a gene that encodes the transmembrane protein 156 (TMEM156) in Homo sapiens. It has the clone name of FLJ23235.

Gene

Locus 
TMEM156 is located on the short arm of Chromosome 4. It is found at position 4p14. It has four known transcripts, only two of which have proteins.

Gene neighborhood 
Cytogenetic band: 4p14

The image above shows chromosome four and the various gene locations on it. TMEM156 can be seen at the thin red band that has been placed at p14.

Size 
TMEM156 is 66,499 bases and 296 amino acids in length. TMEM156 spans from 38,966,744 to 39,032,922 bp.

mRNA

Splice Variants 
TMEM156 has one known splice variant, TMEM156-003. It has one transmembrane region and is 179 amino acids in length resulting in a lower molecular mass of 20.9 kDa. In addition the isoelectric point is 7.0633 and the gene has four transcripts.

Isoforms 
There is one known isoform of TMEM156. This particular isoform uses an alternate in-frame splice site in the 3' coding region. The resulting isoform is shorter than the original.

Protein

Structure

Primary structure 
The TMEM156 protein is 296 amino acids in length. It has a molecular weight of 34.323 kDa and an isoelectric point of 7.98. The protein interacts with the membrane three total times as seen in the figure below.

Secondary Structure 
TMEM156 has a secondary structure composed of primarily α-helices. Phyre was used to create this structure that can be viewed on the right hand side of this article. It is evident that the predicted protein structure is vastly composed of α-helices. The N terminus is located at the top of the image and the C terminus is at the bottom.

Tertiary Structure 
This structure was predicted by analyzing the amino acid sequence using I-TASSER. The final result can be see below.

Post-Translational Modifications 
Glycosylation at Asn 45 and Asn 156 along with N-glycosylation seen in the portion of the protein that is found in the cytoplasm.

Subcellular Location 
The k-NN tool suggests the location of TMEM156 in the Endoplasmic Reticulum of the cell with 44.4% certainty. The following locations were all predicted with 11.1% certainty: vacuolar, vesicles of secretory system, extracellular, plasma membrane, and mitochondrial.

Expression 
TMEM156 is expressed in several tissues including ascites, bone marrow, salivary glands, and vascular to name a few. This gene is not ubiquitously expressed, but is still evident in many tissues. This gene is predominately expressed in adults but there is a bit of expression in fetuses.

Interacting Proteins 
 C12orf55-chromosome 12 open reading frame 55
 FAM92B-family with sequence similarity 92, member B
 NUGGC-nuclear GTPase, germinal center associated
 plays a role as replication-related GTPase
 CEACAM21-carcinoembryonic antigen-related cell adhesion molecule 21
 CPNES-copine V
 may function in membrane trafficking
 exhibits calcium-dependent phospholipid binding properties
 FCRL1-Fc receptor-like 1
 may function as an activating coreceptor in B-cells
 may function in B-cell activation and differentiation
 MEI1-meiosis inhibitor 1
 required for normal meiotic chromosome synapsis
 may be involved in meiotic double strand breaks
 MZB1-marginal zone B and B1 cell-specific protein
 associates with immunoglobulin M (IgM) both heavy and light chains
 promotoes IgM assembly and secretion
 SPAG4-sperm associated antigen 4
 may assist the organization and assembly of outer dense fibers (specific fibers to the sperm tail)
 SLC17A9-solute carrier family 17, member 9
 involved in vesicular storage and exocytosis of ATP

Homology 
Transmembrane protein 156 has one known paralog. It also has various orthologs within eukaryotes. The table below compares an overarching sample of the known orthologs and one paralog. The specific lineage of TMEM156 is: Eukaryota; Metazoa; Chordata; Craniata; Vertebrata; Euteleostomi; Mammalia; Eutheria; Euarchontoglires; Primates; Haplorrhini; Catarrhini; Homindae; Homo.

References

Genes